Daubréelite is a rare sulfide mineral. It crystallizes with cubic symmetry and has chemical composition of Fe2+Cr3+2S4. It usually occurs as black platy aggregates.

Naming and history
Daubréelite was named after the French mineralogist, petrologist and meteoriticist Gabriel Auguste Daubrée. The mineral was first described in 1876 in the American Journal of Science. Its type locality is the Coahuila meteorite, Bolsom de Mapimí, Coahuila, Mexico.

Classification
In the Nickel-Strunz classification daubréelite is part of the "Sulfides and Sulfosalts" and further a "metal sulfide with a metal-sulfide ratio of 3:4 and 2:3".

Occurrences
Daubréelite is found in iron meteorites as an inclusion in meteoric iron (kamacite and taenite). Further paragenetic minerals are alabandine, enstatite, graphite, plagioclase and schreibersite.

According to one source daubréelite has been described from 34 localities. Some notable examples being the ALH 84001 meteorite, Hoba meteorite, and the Canyon Diablo meteorite.

The mineral was also found in the Hadley Rille meteorite which was retrieved by the Apollo 15 mission in the Rima Hadley (Mare Imbrium).

Crystallography
Daubréelite crystallizes with cubic symmetry with the space group Fdm (4/m  2/m). There are 8 formula units in one primitive cell.

See also
 Glossary of meteoritics

References

Meteorite minerals
Cubic minerals
Minerals in space group 227